Ex parte Mitsuye Endo, 323 U.S. 283 (1944), was a United States Supreme Court ex parte decision handed down on December 18, 1944, in which the Justices unanimously ruled that the U.S. government could not continue to detain a citizen who was "concededly loyal" to the United States. Although the Court did not touch on the constitutionality of the exclusion of people of Japanese ancestry from the West Coast, which it had found not to violate citizen rights in its Korematsu v. United States decision on the same date, the Endo ruling nonetheless led to the reopening of the West Coast to Japanese Americans after their incarceration in camps across the U.S. interior during World War II.

The Court also found as part of this decision that if Congress is found to have ratified by appropriation any part of an executive agency program, the bill doing so must include a specific item referring to that portion of the program.

Background
The plaintiff in the case, Mitsuye Endo, had worked as a clerk for the California Department of Motor Vehicles in Sacramento prior to the war. After the attack on Pearl Harbor had soured public sentiment toward Japanese Americans, Endo and other Nisei state employees were harassed and eventually fired because of their Japanese ancestry. Civil rights attorney and then-president of the Japanese American Citizens League Saburo Kido, with the San Francisco attorney James Purcell, began a legal campaign to assist these workers, but the mass removal authorized by Executive Order 9066 in early 1942 complicated their case. Endo was selected as a test case to file a writ of habeas corpus because of her profile as an Americanized, "assimilated" Nisei. She was a practicing Christian, had never been to Japan, spoke only English and no Japanese, and had a brother in the US Army.

On July 13, 1942, Purcell filed the habeas corpus petition for Endo's release from the Tule Lake concentration camp, where she and her family were being held. Judge Michael J. Roche heard Endo's case in July 1942 but did not issue a ruling until July 1943, when he denied her petition without explanation. An appeal was perfected to the Ninth Circuit Court of Appeals in August 1943, and in April 1944, Judge William Denman sent the case to the Supreme Court, rather than issuing a ruling himself. By then, Endo had been transferred to Topaz, Utah—Tule Lake having been converted to a segregated detention center for "disloyal" Japanese American inmates.

In an effort to halt her case, the War Relocation Authority had offered to release her from camp if she agreed not to return to the West Coast, but Endo refused and so remained in confinement.

Endo, Korematsu, and end of internment
The unanimous opinion ruling in Endo's favor was written by Justice William O. Douglas, with Justices Frank Murphy and Owen Roberts concurring. It stopped short of addressing the question of the government's right to exclude citizens based on military necessity but instead focused on the actions of the WRA: "In reaching that conclusion [that Endo should be freed] we do not come to the underlying constitutional issues which have been argued.... [W]e conclude that, whatever power the War Relocation Authority may have to detain other classes of citizens, it has no authority to subject citizens who are concededly loyal to its leave procedure."

Because of that avoidance, it is very difficult to reconcile Endo with Korematsu, which was decided the same day. As Justice Roberts pointed out in his Korematsu dissent, distinguishing the cases required a reliance on the legal fiction that Korematsu dealt with only the exclusion of Japanese Americans, not their detention, and that Fred Korematsu could have gone anywhere else in the United States, when in reality he would have been subject to the detainment found illegal in Endo. In short, Endo determined that a citizen could not be imprisoned if the government was unable to prove disloyalty, but Korematsu allowed the government a loophole to punish that citizen criminally for refusing to be illegally imprisoned.

The Roosevelt administration, having been alerted to the Court's decision, issued Public Proclamation No. 21 the day before the Endo and Korematsu rulings were made public, on December 17, 1944. It rescinded the exclusion orders and declared that Japanese Americans could begin returning to the West Coast in January 1945.

See also
 Hirabayashi v. United States
 Yasui v. United States
 List of United States Supreme Court cases, volume 323

References

External links
 
 

United States Constitution Article One case law
United States Supreme Court cases
Internment of Japanese Americans
1944 in United States case law
Suspension Clause case law
United States Supreme Court cases of the Stone Court